Scott Oxley (born 22 November 1976) is an English former professional footballer who played as a winger in the Football League for York City, and in non-League football for Stocksbridge Park Steels.

References

1976 births
Living people
Footballers from Sheffield
English footballers
Association football wingers
York City F.C. players
Stocksbridge Park Steels F.C. players
English Football League players